Mesocolpodes is a genus of ground beetles in the family Carabidae. This genus has a single species, Mesocolpodes coptoderoides. It is found in Mauritius.

References

Platyninae